Olga Chorens (born 7 February 1924) is a Cuban singer and actress. She started music early as young as 11. She gained huge fame after performing in the Cuban radio musical program Ritmos del Plata hosted by Tony Álvarez. They both played with Orquesta Río De La Plata. They eventually married.

Career
In 1951, Chorens co-hosted and co-starred with her husband in the popular entertainment show on Televisora CMQ in Cuba. Known as Olga y Tony after the programme name El Show de Olga y Tony, it was a live daily platform with live orchestra made up of renowned artists would take part. All guests performed live with choir accompaniment whenever necessary. Tony and Olga would also perform various songs during the broadcast.

She also appeared in roles in a number of films, for example in Romance Musical with the contribution of great actor Otto Sirgo and Enriqueta Sierra.

Personal life
With the beginning of the Cuban revolution and arrival of Fidel Castro, the couple went into exile in 1963 and lived in Mexico and in Isla Verde, Puerto Rico, and later in Miami, New York and Spain.

They are the parents of Cuban singer, songwriter, and record producer Lissette Álvarez, and recording artist and news anchor Olga Alvarez.

References 

1924 births
Living people
Cuban television actresses
Cuban women singers
People from Havana